The Trujillo Metropolitan Area is the name used to refer to the metropolitan area whose core is the city of Trujillo, capital La Libertad Region, this metropolitan area located on the north coast of Peru, extends over an area of approximately 110,000 hectares and comprises nine of the eleven districts that make up the province of Trujillo. According to population statistics of INEI, It is the third most populous metropolitan area of Peru.

History 

Trujillo, years ago separated from the other localities by the wall Trujillo, is now fully expanded to the four cardinal points of the ancient wall fragments are only historically preserved. However, Trujillo has been influential to nearby cities for decades, having great interaction with them. The urban integration of some of these towns to the metropolis has led its growth. An aerial photograph from the satellite shows a single urban area where it is difficult to distinguish the boundaries of Trujillo and its conurbation metropolitan districts, virtually separated only administratively.

Planning
The Planning of Peruvian metropolitan areas are made, by the government of municipalities of each city, with authority granted by Organic Law of Municipalities, and they have the support of an expert office for urban planning with specific functions. Wherefore officially valid data about districts conformation for metropolitan areas in Peru are those issued by official documents issued and validated by the respective municipal governments of each city under the law that local governments are autonomous political, economic and administrative matters within its jurisdiction and its powers according to the law of municipalities, an attribution of these is to approve the urban development plan.

Extent and structure 
The metropolitan area of Trujillo occupies a territory whose length is approximately 110,000 hectares, and comprises the lower Moche Valley or Valle de Santa Catalina and Intervalles to Chicama valley to the north and the Viru Valley southward with its central theme the irrigation project Chavimochic.

Population
According to PLANDET, agency of the Municipality of the city, Metropolitan Trujillo consists of the so-called Trujillo Urban Continuum formed by the districts of Trujillo, El Porvenir, Florencia de Mora, La Esperenza and Victor Larco Herrera, and the sector El Milagro of Huanchaco District, as well as all urban and rural settlements in the valley of Santa Catalina, the Moche river basin, which correspond to the districts of Huanchaco, Laredo, Moche and Salaverry, organized as a unit of planning.

In the table is shown some data of the districts of Trujillo Metropolitan:

Graphics of evolution of the population by INEI

Sources: Population 2007

Population by districts

In the following table of population distribution can be seen the demographic evolution of Trujillo metropolitan by districts.

See also 
 List of metropolitan areas of Peru
 Trujillo
 La Libertad Region
 Peru

External links
Location of Trujillo city (Wikimapia)
"Huaca de la luna and Huaca del sol"
"Huacas del Sol y de la Luna Archaeological Complex", Official Website
Information on El Brujo Archaeological Complex
Chan Chan World Heritage Site, UNESCO
Chan Chan conservation project
Website about Trujillo, Reviews, Events, Business Directory

Multimedia

 
 
 
 Gallery pictures by Panoramio, Includes Geographical information by various authors

References

Geography of Trujillo, Peru
Metropolitan areas of Peru